Q23 may refer to:
 Q23 (New York City bus)
 Al-Mu’minun, the 23rd surah of the Quran
 , a Naïade-class submarine
 ITU-T Recommendation Q.23, a telephony standard
 London Underground Q23 Stock